Selfafornia is the sixth studio album by alternative pop/rock band Self.

The album contains the original toy version of the song "Suzie Q Sailaway" that was written on toy instruments for the album Gizmodgery. A non-toy version of the track was instead released on Breakfast with Girls. The album was released for free in 2000 and is still available for download at Selfies' archive.

Track listing

External links
http://www.self-centered.org The Self Fan Community - lyrics and other information

2000 albums
Self (band) albums
Albums free for download by copyright owner